Garland Anthony Jean-Batiste (born April 2, 1965) is a former American football running back who was a 1987 replacement player for the New Orleans Saints. He played in three games.

Early life
Jean-Batiste was born on April 2, 1965 in Lafeyette, Louisiana. He went to high school at Martinville (LA).

College career
He went to college at LSU. In 1983 he only had 1 rush in one game but it went for 58 yards.

In 1984 he played in 8 games and had 32 rushes for 145 yards and a touchdown. He also had 2 receptions for 9 yards. 

In 1985 he had 23 rushes for 89 yards. He also had 1 catch for 4 yards.

In 1986 Garland Jean-Batiste had 50 rushes for 260 yards. He also had 8 catches for 50 yards and a touchdown.

Professional career
He was signed as a replacement player by the New Orleans Saints in 1987. He played in week 4 to 6. In week 6 he had his only statistics; 8 rushes for 18 yards in a 19-17 win against the Chicago Bears. That was his last game.

References

Living people
1965 births
LSU Tigers football players
American football running backs
New Orleans Saints players
Players of American football from Louisiana
Sportspeople from Lafayette, Louisiana
National Football League replacement players